The 2003 Lower Austrian state election was held on 30 March 2003 to elect the members of the Landtag of Lower Austria.

The election was won by the Austrian People's Party (ÖVP), who won an absolute majority in the Landtag for the first time since 1988. They achieved a strong swing of 8.4 percentage points. The Social Democratic Party of Austria (SPÖ) and The Greens also made gains; this was enabled by the collapse of the Freedom Party of Austria (FPÖ). The FPÖ lost almost three-quarters of its vote share and only narrowly passed the 4% electoral threshold, falling from nine seats to just two.

Background
The Lower Austrian constitution mandates that cabinet positions in the state government (state councillors) be allocated between parties proportionally in accordance with the share of votes won by each; this is known as Proporz. As such, the government is a perpetual coalition of all parties that qualify for at least one state councillor. After the 1998 election, the ÖVP had five councillors, the SPÖ three, and the FPÖ one.

Electoral system
The 56 seats of the Landtag of Lower Austria are elected via open list proportional representation in a two-step process. The seats are distributed between twenty-one multi-member constituencies. For parties to receive any representation in the Landtag, they must either win at least one seat in a constituency directly, or clear a 4 percent state-wide electoral threshold. Seats are distributed in constituencies according to the Hare quota, with any remaining seats allocated using the D'Hondt method at the state level, to ensure overall proportionality between a party's vote share and its share of seats.

Contesting parties
The table below lists parties represented in the previous Landtag.

In addition to the parties already represented in the Landtag, three parties collected enough signatures to be placed on the ballot.

 Green independent Austria – List of EU Opposition Gabriela Wladyka (GRÜNÖ)
 Communist Party of Austria (KPÖ)
 Christian Voter Community (CWG)

Results

Results by constituency

References

Lower Austrian state election
State elections in Austria
Lower Austrian state election